Welfare is the provision of a safety net of minimal level of well-being and social support for all citizens.

Welfare may also refer to:

General well-being
Examples of usage of the term to denote the general well-being of an individual or group of individuals include:
 Well-being, what is intrinsically valuable for someone
Prosperity, a state of flourishing
 Animal welfare, the quality of life of animals, and concerns thereabout

Economics
 Welfare or economic surplus, the sum of consumer and producer surplus, used by economists as a substitute for utility
 Welfare economics, the microeconomic study of allocative efficiency and associated income distribution

Government-run public aid 
In the United States, the term "welfare" has developed negative connotations due to its association with dependency, as in the terms:
 Corporate welfare, term describing the bestowal of benefits upon corporations by government
 Welfare fraud, intentional misuse of welfare programs by providing false information
 Welfare queen, a pejorative term for a person accused of collecting excess welfare payments
 Welfare state, the concept of government's playing a key role in individual economic and social well-being

Other uses
 Welfare (1975), a film by Frederick Wiseman
 HMS Welfare, the name of two ships of the Royal Navy, and one planned ship